Cool Cat is a 2009 Children's picture book by Nonny Hogrogian. In this wordless book, a cat is joined by other animals to colourfully paint a ruined brown landscape.

Reception
A reviewer in The Seattle Times of Cool Cat wrote "Hogrogian’s art can seem deceptively simple, but she is a picture-book master who knows how to keep readers turning the pages.", and School Library Journal wrote "Both visually and conceptually, this is a gem.".

Cool Cat has also been reviewed by Kirkus Reviews, Publishers Weekly, The Horn Book Magazine, Library Media Connection, and The Bulletin of the Center for Children's Books.

References

External links
Library holdings of Cool Cat

2009 children's books
American picture books
Books about cats